Koreish Sultan was son of Abdurashid Khan

Probably his father appointed him as governor of Khotan since 1533 where he was governing till 1570. After the death in 1570 of Shah Khan in one of skirmishes with Kalmaks, who was  a ruler in Uyghurstan (Chalish , Turpan and Kumul), Abdul Karim Khan of Yarkand Khanate sent his brother Abduraim Sultan to rule Uyghurstan. The four brothers of Shah Khan expelled Abduraim Sultan  and this action started struggle for power between them. One of brothers Abul Muhammad Sultan, or Muhei-me of Chinese sources, declared himself a ruler a sent Embassy to the Ming dynasty, but other 3 brothers didn't recognize him and one of them, Sufi Sultan, or So-fei of Chinese sources, sent another Embassy to the Ming dynasty. Abdul Karim Khan didn't want to see increasing of influence of the Ming dynasty in Uyghurstan and sent Koreish Sultan to subdue Shah Khan's brothers and restore Abduraim Sultan as a  Little Khan in Turpan. Koreish Sultan conquered Chalish, Turpan and Kumul, but after that refused to give these cities to Abduraim Sultan and appointed himself as a Little Khan. Abdul Karim Khan ordered to another brother Muhammad Sultan to quell Koreish Sultan mutiny and to bring Koreish Sultan back to Yarkand  alive. Koreish Sultan managed to repel all attacks on Turpan from Muhammad Sultan troops who were recruited in Aksu, Bai and Kucha, but finally it was decided to peacefully settle this conflict. Chalish was given to Hudabende Sultan, son of Koraish Sultan, while Koreish Sultan was exiled to the Mughal Empire.

On 11 Amardād (about 21 July 1589) Moghul Emperor Akbar travelled to Shihābu-d-dīnpūr in Kashmir. Here Sultan Koreish of Kāshghar arrived and was received with royal favours. His lineage goes back to the great Qāān (Chengiz Khan). He was son of Abdurashid Khan.

References 
Shah Mahmud Churas Chronicles  (written in 1670 in Yarkand in 118 chapters) Translation and research by Akimushkin O.F. Main publishing house of Eastern literature " Nauka". Moscow,1976
Kutlukov M  About foundation of Yarkand Khanate (1465-1759). "Pan" publishing house . Almata,1990

Uyghurs
Chagatai khans